Division No. 1, Unorganized, or Whiteshell Unorganized, is a Statistics Canada census subdivision of its Division No. 1, Manitoba that consists of a part of the division that is not organized into either incorporated municipalities or Indian reserves. Unlike in some other provinces, census divisions do not reflect the organization of local government in Manitoba.

It is located at the southeast corner of Manitoba, along the border of both the Province of Ontario and the U.S. State of Minnesota. The northern half of the subdivision consists of Manitoba's Whiteshell Provincial Park. The 2006 Census reported a population of 1,130, a 68.66% increase from the 670 reported in the 2001 Census. Several Indian reserves are located within the territory of the southern portion, although they are not administratively a part of it. They include the Buffalo Point First Nation, Reed River 36A First Nation, Iskatewizaagegan 39 Independent First Nation, and Shoal Lake 40 First Nation Indian reserves.

Geography
According to Statistics Canada, the census subdivision has an area of 4,129.58 km2 (1,594.44 sq mi).

Adjacent rural municipalities and counties
Rural Municipality of Reynolds - (west)
Rural Municipality of Whitemouth - (west)
Pinawa, Manitoba - (west)
Rural Municipality of Lac du Bonnet - (west)
Rural Municipality of Alexander - (northwest)
Unorganized Division No. 19 - (north)
Unorganized Kenora - (east)
Shoal Lake 39A - (east)
Shoal Lake 40 First Nation - (east)
Lake of the Woods County, Minnesota - (southeast)
Buffalo Point First Nation - (south)
Rural Municipality of Piney - (southwest)

References

Unorganized areas in Manitoba
Unincorporated communities in Eastman Region, Manitoba